In general, incentives are anything that persuade a person to alter their behaviour. It is emphasised that incentives matter by the basic law of economists and the laws of behaviour, which state that higher incentives amount to greater levels of effort and therefore, higher levels of performance.

Divisions
Incentives can be broken down into two categories; intrinsic incentives and extrinsic incentives. The motivation of people's behaviour comes from within. In activities, they are often motivated by the task itself or the internal reward rather than the external reward. There are many internal rewards, for example, participating in activities can satisfy people's sense of achievement and bring them positive emotions. An intrinsic incentive is when a person is motivated to act in a certain way for their own personal satisfaction. This means that when a person is intrinsically incentivised, they perform a certain task to please themselves and are not seeking any external reward, nor facing any external pressure to perform the task. On the other hand, an extrinsic incentive is when a person has external pressure persuading them to act in a particular way. The external pressure could include either a reward for completing the task or could be a form of punishment or consequence if the task is not completed. When people have difficulty completing a task or lack interest in participating in an activity, extrinsic incentives can often be effective in helping people improve their motivation.  

Intrinsic incentives and extrinsic incentives are both important and drive people's behaviour. However, people's intrinsic motivation tends to decrease when they are offered too many extrinsic rewards, in order to maintain the action, constant incentives have to be provided, which is known as the Overjustification Effect.   

In the context of economics, incentives are most studied in the area of personnel economics where economic analysts, such as those tho take part in human resources management practices, focus on how firms make employees more motivated, through pay and career concerns, compensation and performance evaluation, to motivate employees and best achieve the firms desired performance outcomes.

Overall, the standard "law of behaviour" suggests that more incentives will result in higher performance and higher effort, people can reach their performance to the next level by rewarding. 
As a result, extrinsic incentives are commonly used within the workforce by employers and managers. This is because, employers believe that the more they encourage their employees to act in a certain way, the more the company will benefit in reaching its organisational goals. However, there are some parties who opposed the benefits of using extrinsic incentives and believe they cause more harm than good. This is because these opponents believe that the constant use of extrinsic incentives can lead to crowding out of intrinsic incentives, which are also valuable performance motivators. When people are constantly being incentivised by external pressures, they neglect their intrinsic motives which could consequently ruin their work ethic. This is because, these people can become too comfortable with always gaining some reward for acting in a certain way, people think that they deserve to earn rewards for doing certain things, not for the benefits of the firm but benefits of themselves, leading to them to take no action if no extrinsic incentive is involved. 
Nonetheless, incentives (both intrinsic and extrinsic) can be beneficial in altering a persons behaviour and can be effectively used and executed within many different areas of life including in the workforce, in education and within one's personal life.

Classification

Classified by David Callahan, the types of incentives can be further broken down into three broad classes according to the different ways in which they motivate agents to take a particular course of actions:

Monetary incentives
Monetary incentives are a monetary good given to someone to incentivize their actions. This is a type of extrinsic incentive and is commonly seen in the workplace. They can come in the forms of profit sharing, bonuses, stock options or even paid vacation time. Well-chosen monetary incentive programs can produce positive motivation and influence the productivity and output of individuals and firms. Firms use a variety of methods to implement productive behavior. 

A common monetary incentive system is the performance-based pay where incentives are paid based on their productivity or output. Some methods are commission based where the employee, for examples a salesperson receives a payment directly correlated to their output level. Firms also pay extra wages or rewards for employees who work overtime and extra amount of work they done, incentives in this way make the employees feel fair and willing to do the same next time. Other methods are less direct, for example awarding periodic bonuses to top performers, offering a possibility of a promotion to higher-paying position or profit sharing for team projects. Alternatively, firms can also incentives their employees to perform by threatening to demote or terminate them. When employees feel their careers are threatened, they will show higher performance and efficiency in work.

The effect of monetary incentives can depend on the framing of the rewards. For example, in cadaveric organ donation, funeral aids are perceived to be more ethical (particularly in showing gratitude and honoring the deceased donor) and potentially increase donation willingness than direct cash payments of the same monetary value.

Non-monetary incentives
A non-monetary incentive is an incentive which takes the form of a non-cash incentive. They are still used as forms of motivation but are much more cost effective in incentivizing employees who have performed highly. Some examples of these incentives include extra time off, recognition, gifts, family benefits or even work based perks such as projects etc. Rewards such as these tend to boost employees job satisfaction as they feel more appreciated for their efforts. Firms with higher job satisfaction and morale have found to have better overall employee contribution and hence better productivity. Compared to monetary incentives, studies have shown that employees find non-monetary incentives more memorable as they are separated from normal pay and hence are more distinguishable. This creates more meaning and satisfaction in working environments.

Effective use of non-monetary incentives can increase the morale of firms as well which has also seen to increase productivity. This type of incentive has commonly been used to directly enhance job satisfaction of employees. Studies have shown that non-monetary rewards, such as extra holidays and more responsibilities, increase job satisfaction more than monetary incentives. This is likely due to the correlation between non-monetary incentives and job satisfaction. Non-monetary incentives also offer an opportunity for skill and responsibility development of workers, which can often mean higher wage in the long run. These incentives are very important to firms and create better working environments for employees.

Incentives in economic context
The economic analysis of incentives focuses on the systems that dictate the incentives needed for an agent to achieve a desired outcome. Incentives can help companies link employees' rewards to their productivity. When a firm wants their employees to produce a certain amount of output, it must be prepared to offer a compensation scheme such as a monetary bonus to influence the employees to reach the target output. Compensation must achieve two goals: The first is to reduce employee turnover, compensating employees can help attract workers to work and retain their ability. The second is to improve productivity, compensation can not only stimulate the ability of workers to produce output, but also improve the enthusiasm of employees to work, thus promoting business development. A rise in pay variance across occupations reflects an increased demand for highly productive workers thus, influencing compensation to shift towards pay-for-performance. This helps employees recognize the direct relationship between their work output and their reward. More and more companies are realizing that they can offer different incentives to employees because they have different economic needs. 

Firms must design the compensation plan to induce workers to operate in the firms best interest and put forth a certain level of output that maximizes the firm's profits. However, since the interest of workers and their employer do not always align and asymmetric information, where one (worker/ employer) does not know some relevant facts about the other,  make the compensation plan difficult to establish.  Here, the principal-agent theory is used as the guiding framework when aligning incentives with the employees effort  to obtain the efficient level of output for the firm. For example, a manager may want a certain level of output from an employee but does not know the capabilities of the employee in the presence of imperfect monitoring, and to achieve the best outcome, an optimal scheme of incentive may be set to motivate the worker to increase their productivity.

The Tournament theory also provide a framework of compensation but at different levels of the firms hierarchy. The theory demonstrates that individuals are not promoted on the basis of their performance and output, instead on the relative position in the organization. The theory also explains that the compensation does not necessarily motivate the employee currently working at that level but instead motivates the employees below that level who aim at getting promoted.

Potential issues
Incentives are arguably beneficial in increasing productivity, however, they can also have an adverse effect on the firm. This is evident through the ratchet effect. A firm may use its observation of the employees output level when they first get employed as a guide to set performance standard and objectives for the future. Knowing this, an employee may purposely reduce their output level when first employed or hide their ability to produce at a  higher output with the intent of exploiting being rewarded in the future when they strategically increase their output level. Best performances of employees can be limited from it. Thus, the ratchet effect can significantly diminish production levels of a firm and planned economies.

Additionally, since the 1970s psychologists begun exploring the role of motivators, whilst economist were simultaneously studying crowding out effects. This came as a result of Richard Titmus' 1970 publication 'The Gift Relationship' which explained how the constant use of extrinsic incentives can result in conflict with other motivators and lead to crowding out effects. In his publication Titmus argued that the use of monetary incentives was disrupting social norms around the idea of voluntary contribution and would ultimately have a crowing out effect. He acknowledged that if the incentives are large enough it is more likely to offset crowding out effects, but noted that making the incentives too large could also have an adverse effect and result in people not meeting expectations. However, crowding out can still take place when incentives are removed over the long run. This is because the removal of incentives can result in employee effort levels being lower than when the incentives were offered thereby hindering motivation and performance. 

Neither do incentives not always increase motivation as they can contribute to the self-selection of individuals, as different people are attracted by different incentive schemes depending on their attitudes towards risk, uncertainty, competitiveness. For example, some corporate policies popular during the 1990s aimed to encourage productivity have led to failures as a result of unintended consequences. Another example, providing stock options were intended to boost CEO productivity through offering a remunerative incentive to aligning the CEOs interests with those of the shareholders to improve company performance. However,  CEOs were found to either make good decisions which resulted in a reward of a long-term price increase of the stock, or were found to have  fabricated the accounting information to give the illusion of economic success and to retain their incentive based pay. Furthermore, it has been found to be extremely costly for the firms to incentivize the CEOs with stock options, nevertheless,  firms are forced to pay substantial amounts of money for the provision that the CEO acts in the best interest of the firms and profit maximization.

Incentives can have a bipolar effect on the company.
On the one hand, the company's incentives to employees may create a pay gap. For example, low-paid employees may reduce their production or contribution to the company. For example, low-paid employees and high-paid employees may not be able to communicate and cooperate effectively, causing low-paid employees to gradually lose their enthusiasm for work. Firms should provide fair amount of incentives for both low-paid and other employees, incentives for low-paid works can be breaks rather than monetary incentives. Motivating employees with financial rewards may make a difference. That's because if the company is profitable in the first year, it may have plenty of bonuses to hand out to employees. However, if the company makes less money in the second year than it did in the first year, the company may not be able to give employees the same bonuses as in the first year even though they put in the same effort. This also reduces employees' motivation to work. Therefore, incentives may be counterproductive. Firm can provides other types of incentives rather than monetary incentives, such as promotion or vacation breaks for employees of highly performance. 

On the other hand, incentives have a positive effect on education. For example, students may underestimate their own learning ability. Incentive not only makes teachers or parents pay more attention to students' abilities, but also encourages students to bring good learning returns. However, it is worth noting that monetary incentives may not be positive. There may be bribery education in monetary incentives, and this monetary incentive is often contrary to morality.

Teamwork is very important to the productivity of the company and will also serve as an incentive for the company. When employees encounter difficult problems, the company effectively incentives employees' performance by establishing teams to communicate and collaborate with each other. In particular, when the abilities of employees form complementary forms, the company's incentive effect achieves a good performance. On the contrary, in teamwork, by contrast, companies that reward individual achievement cause team members to split when employees rely too much on the output of the team, the incentive of teamwork will have a certain negative effect on the company's production.

Ultimately, there is always potential for conflicts to arise, both in the short and in the long run, during the application of incentives in different areas, as incentives that seek to change behaviours can cause crowing out on intrinsic motivators. Growing evidence suggests that economists must broaden their focus when exploring the effects of incentives as the effect they have is largely dependent on how they are designed and specifically how they interact with intrinsic and social motivators in the short run and the long run.

See also

 Climate finance
 Climate Investment Funds
 Bounty (reward)
 Eco-investing
 Environmental Quality Incentives Program
 Externality
 Incentive-centered design
 Incentive payments
 Incentive program
 Incentive trust
 Incentivization
 Investment incentive
 Long-term incentive plan
 Loyalty marketing
 Loyalty program
 Motivation
 Motivational salience
 Motivations of open source programmers
 Motivations for online participation
 Performance-related pay
 Perverse incentive
 Positive-incentive value
 Profit motive
 Research and Development Tax Incentive
 Reward system
 Social Impact Incentives
 Steering tax
 Tax incentive
 Travel incentive
 Wicked problem

References 

Personal finance
Microeconomics
Motivation
Macroeconomics